Gilbert Schneider (born 4 January 1965 in Troisdorf) is a West German sprint canoer who competed in the late 1980s. He won two bronze medals at the ICF Canoe Sprint World Championships, earning them in 1986 (K-4 500 m) and a 1987 (K-4 10000 m).

Schneider also finished sixth in the K-4 1000 m event at the 1988 Summer Olympics in Seoul.

References

1965 births
Canoeists at the 1988 Summer Olympics
German male canoeists
Living people
Olympic canoeists of West Germany
ICF Canoe Sprint World Championships medalists in kayak
People from Troisdorf
Sportspeople from Cologne (region)